The Women's Athletic Club of Alameda County, at 525 Bellevue Ave. in Oakland, California, was built in 1928–29.  It was listed on the National Register of Historic Places in 2009.  It has also been known as The Bellevue Club, as Women's Athletic Club, and as Bellevue Club Building.

The Women's Athletic Club of Alameda was formed in 1926 and purchased the site.  It hired architects Charles F.B. Roeth and E. Geoffrey Bangs to design their building.  Its name was changed to "The Bellevue Club" in the 1990s.

The building is a  clubhouse, with a stucco exterior, plus an internal parking garage.  It was built as a five-story (plus partial basement and attic) squarish footprint building, with a one-story section behind.  A one-story garage addition at the rear was added in 1964.  The interior spaces are Chateauesque or Classical Revival in style.

References

External links

Women's club buildings in California
National Register of Historic Places in Alameda County, California
Neoclassical architecture in California
Buildings and structures completed in 1928
History of women in California